Cecropia obtusifolia is a species of plant in the family Urticaceae. It is found in Colombia, Costa Rica, Nicaragua, Mexico and Panama. Common Names include trumpet tree, pop-a-gun, tree-of-laziness, and snakewood tree. In Central America it is known as Guarumo. Though impressive silhouetted against the sky, it is an invasive species in the islands of Hawaii.

Cecropia obtusifolia is used in traditional Amerindian medicine. Many other species of the genus Cecropia share the folk reputation of curing heart failure, cough, asthma and bronchitis. Cecropia obtusifolia has vasorelaxant activity due possibly to inhibition of angiotensin.

References

obtusifolia
Least concern plants
Myrmecophytes
Taxonomy articles created by Polbot